Mała Nieszawka  is a village in the administrative district of Gmina Wielka Nieszawka, within Toruń County, Kuyavian-Pomeranian Voivodeship, in north-central Poland.

The village has a population of 1,400.

History
Polish–Teutonic peace talks, which ended the Thirteen Years' War, were held in the settlement at the turn of September and October 1466.

During the German occupation (World War II), in November 1939, Polish teachers from Mała Nieszawka were murdered by the Germans in Barbarka (present-day district of Toruń) during a massacre of Polish teachers from the region carried out as part of the Intelligenzaktion. Poles were also subjected to expulsions, carried out in November 1940.

References

Populated places on the Vistula
Villages in Toruń County